Cernik may refer to:

 Cernik, Brod-Posavina County, a village in Croatia
 Cernik, Primorje-Gorski Kotar County, a village near Čavle, Croatia
 Cernik, Zagreb County, a village in Žumberak, Croatia
 Černík (disambiguation)

See also 
 Cerna (disambiguation)